Apytalaukis (formerly) is a village in Kėdainiai district municipality, in Kaunas County, in central Lithuania. According to the 2011 census, the village had a population of 91 people. There is a Catholic church of St. Peter and St. Paul (built in 1635) with a graveyard, a manor palace (built in 1850) with a park. Nearby Apytalaukis there is a collective gardening area (Vasariškiai).

History
Apytalaukis has been known since 1371 when it was mentioned by Hermann von Wartberge. The Apytalaukis Manor has been known since the 15th century. A school was established in the manor in 1811. The manor was a property of the Tyszkiewicz and the Zabiela families in the 19th century. In 1976, a psycho-neurological boarding school was established in the manor.

Demography

Images

References

Villages in Kaunas County
Kėdainiai District Municipality